Elias E. Saleeby is a retired Liberian banker.

Early life 

He obtained his BS in Accounting from the University of Dayton in Ohio, USA. Then he earned his MBA, specializing in Finance, from Xavier University in Cincinnati. Later he completed his DBA in Finance & Economics from Kent State University. His doctoral dissertation focused on the role of central banks in developing countries.

Professional career 

Saleeby worked as a business analyst at the world headquarters of Xerox for about two years before briefly joining the World Bank. Saleeby returned to Liberia in 1973 at the request of former Liberian president William R. Tolbert Jr., and former Minister of Finance Steve Tolbert, to head the Liberian Bank for Development and Investment (LBDI). The LBDI was created by an Act of the National Legislature in 1961 under the joint initiative of major international financial institutions that purchased equity in the Bank. It commenced operations in 1965. In 1974 the name was changed to the Liberian Bank for Development and Investment (LBDI). Elie Saleeby made history by becoming LBDI's youngest President and CEO at the age of 31. He returned to the World Bank in 1980, holding a variety of positions until 1997 and specializing in financial sector reforms.

Public service 

He held the position of Minister of Finance from 1997 to 1999, and the position of Executive Governor of the Central Bank of Liberia from 1999 until his resignation in 2004.

References

External links 

 
 
 
 The Liberian Bank for Development and Investment

Year of birth missing (living people)
Living people
Liberian bankers
Liberian economists
Finance Ministers of Liberia